Tsai Performance Center is a concert hall located within Boston University's College of Arts and Sciences building. Constructed in 1989, the facility was made possible by a $5.5 million gift from the Tsai Family, particularly Gerald Tsai, who served as a trustee and an honorary board member of the university for a number of years. At the time, the Tsai pledge was the largest individual gift from a single donor in the history of Boston University. The Tsai Performance Center is the home of the New England Philharmonic.

See also

 Gerald Tsai

References

Boston University
Concert halls in Massachusetts
1989 establishments in Massachusetts
Cultural infrastructure completed in 1989